This is the list of feature-length theatrical films produced and released by the Filipino motion picture company Star Cinema since its foundation in 1993.

1990s

1993

1994

1995

1996

1997

1998

1999

2000s

2000

2001

2002

2003

2004

2005

2006

2007

2008

2009

2010s

2010

2011

2012

2013

2014

2015

2016

2017

2018

2019

2020s

2020

2021

2022

List of Black Sheep films

References

External links
Official Website

 
Star Cinema
Star Cinema